This is a list of the National Register of Historic Places listings in Pipestone County, Minnesota.  It is intended to be a complete list of the properties and districts on the National Register of Historic Places in Pipestone County, Minnesota, United States.  The locations of National Register properties and districts for which the latitude and longitude coordinates are included below, may be seen in an online map.

There are 16 properties and districts listed on the National Register in the county, including one National Monument.  A supplementary list includes one additional site that was formerly on the National Register.  Many of Pipestone County's listings are constructed of locally quarried Sioux Quartzite.

Current listings

  Likely demolished (see talk page).

|}

Former listings

|}

See also
 List of National Historic Landmarks in Minnesota
 National Register of Historic Places listings in Minnesota

References

External links

 Pipestone, Minnesota—A National Register of Historic Places Travel Itinerary

Pipestone County